"Highwire" is an anti-war song by English rock band the Rolling Stones, featured on their 1991 live album, Flashpoint. Written by Mick Jagger and Keith Richards, the song is one of the rare examples of the Stones taking on political issues—in this case, the fall-out from Persian Gulf War.

"Highwire" was released as Flashpoints first single on 1 March 1991. It reached number four in Finland, Norway, and Portugal, number six in the Netherlands, number 10 in Canada, and number 57 in the United States. In the latter country, the single peaked at number one on the Billboard Album Rock Tracks chart for three weeks. An accompanying video directed by Julien Temple was released and depicts the Stones in an industrial set performing the song.

Background
On the song, Jagger said at the time of its release, "It's not about the war. It's about how it started." His brother, Chris Jagger noted "it is a sideways swipe at the policies surrounding the Gulf War". Richards continued, saying, "This is not about the war. It's about how you build up some shaky dictator. You can't build them up, 'cause then you've got to slam them down."

The song's lyrics deconstructs the build-up to the war and criticises the politics behind it:

Critical reception
Pan-European magazine Music & Media wrote, "Still controversial after all these years -- that is a compliment in itself. This antiwar song sounds as if it was recorded in the days of Exile On Main Street. Richards's mean guitar riff underpins Jagger's biting vocals. No DJ can possibly deny the strong impact of it."

Music video
The accompanying music video for "Highwire" shows the band members performing against an industrial backdrop. The video did not feature Bill Wyman, leading to speculation that he had left the band. "Highwire" proved to be his last single release with the band, although his departure was not confirmed until 1993.

Personnel
 Mick Jagger – vocals
 Keith Richards – guitar
 Ron Wood – guitar, pedal steel guitar
 Bill Wyman – bass guitar
 Charlie Watts – drums

Charts

Weekly charts

Year-end charts

See also
 List of anti-war songs
 List of number-one mainstream rock hits (United States)

References

The Rolling Stones songs
1991 singles
1991 songs
Music videos directed by Julien Temple
Protest songs
Song recordings produced by Jagger–Richards
Songs written by Jagger–Richards